Marcel Schied, after his marriage Marcel von Walsleben-Schied, (born 28 July 1983) is a German professional footballer who plays as a striker for NOFV-Oberliga Nord club MSV Pampow.

Career
Von Walsleben-Schied was born in Weißenfels. He spent three seasons in the Bundesliga with Hansa Rostock and returned to the club for a second spell from 1 July 2009 to 30 June 2019.

In 2016 he joined Hamburg-based club TuS Dassendorf in the fifth tier.

In December 2020 he announced his retirement from playing, having made four appearances for SV Curslack-Neuengamme. He unretired and started playing again in the 2021–22 season.

References

External links
 

Living people
1983 births
People from Weißenfels
Association football forwards
German footballers
Footballers from Saxony-Anhalt
Germany under-21 international footballers
Germany youth international footballers
Bundesliga players
2. Bundesliga players
3. Liga players
Regionalliga players
Oberliga (football) players
FC Hansa Rostock players
VfL Osnabrück players
SpVgg Unterhaching players
FC Carl Zeiss Jena players
Eintracht Braunschweig players
Holstein Kiel players
TSG Neustrelitz players
TuS Dassendorf players